Delaware and Hudson locomotives Nos 1205 and 1216 are the only surviving Baldwin Sharknoses. They have been stored out of service at the Escanaba and Lake Superior Railroad since 1982.

The locomotives were part of a fleet of 18 on the New York Central Railroad, and were originally numbered 3805 and 3816. The Central later gave them the numbers that they would retain for the rest of their career: 1205 and 1216.

After years of service on the New York Central, they were traded in to GE Transportation Systems, but instead of scrapping them, GE sold them to the Monongahela Railway for $6000 each, along with seven others. The Sharknoses hauled coal trains for the Monongahela between 1967 and 1972. By 1972, 1205 and 1216 were the only operable locomotives of the bunch, and the entire group was sold for scrap.

In 1974, the locomotives still had not been cut up, and the Delaware and Hudson Railway exchanged $12,000 of scrap boxcars for 1205 and 1216. The D&H used the locomotives in freight service until 1978.

In April 1978 the pair was sold to the Castolite Corporation, a locomotive leasing firm. From April to December 1978, they were leased to their final operator, the Michigan Northern Railway. It was not long before No. 1205 suffered a crankshaft failure in April 1979, and it was sent to be serviced at Diesel Electric Service Corporation in St. Paul, MN. and was later stored out of service at the Escanaba and Lake Superior Railroad in April 1980. No. 1216 continued to work until February 1982 before finally having mechanical failure and joining No. 1205 in storage. The locomotives are indoors and out of view. In January 2020, owner and president of Escanaba & Lake Superior Railroad, John C. Larkin had an exclusive interview with Trains News Wire, saying that upon his death, the two Sharks would be sent to museums for future preservation, but subsequent 2021 reporting revealed that a full restoration was economically unfeasible at that time.

In December 2021, No. 1216 was moved from storage in Escanaba, Michigan to a shop at the railroad's headquarters in Wells, Michigan to free up space for freight car cleaning at the Escanaba car shop.

References

External links

Diesel-electric locomotives of the United States
Baldwin locomotives
B-B locomotives
New York Central Railroad locomotives
Delaware and Hudson Railway
Standard gauge locomotives of the United States
Railway locomotives introduced in 1951